Harbhajan Rai (born December 27, 1961), is an Indian-born Canadian former field hockey player.  He was born in Jalandhar Cantonment, Punjab, India.

Rai competed at the 1984 Summer Olympics in Los Angeles, California. There he finished in tenth place with the Men's National Team.

International senior competitions

 1984 – Olympic Games, Los Angeles (10th)

References
 Canadian Olympic Committee

External links
 

1961 births
Canadian male field hockey players
Field hockey players at the 1984 Summer Olympics
Indian emigrants to Canada
Field hockey players from Jalandhar
Living people
Olympic field hockey players of Canada
Canadian sportspeople of Indian descent
Canadian people of Punjabi descent
Pan American Games medalists in field hockey
Pan American Games gold medalists for Canada
Field hockey players at the 1983 Pan American Games
Medalists at the 1983 Pan American Games